The Prime Minister's Office of Bangladesh ( — ) formerly known as Sangsad Bhaban / Presidential Secretariat, is the Prime Minister of Bangladesh's administrative office with the responsibility of coordinating the duties and executive actions of all governmental ministry offices on various matters primarily serving and assisting the prime minister's duties. It is located at Tejgaon in Dhaka city. The Office of the Prime Minister of Bangladesh is the official executive office with the official residence of the prime minister in Gonobhaban at Sher-e-Bangla Nagor, Dhaka.

The Office

Before 1991 it was the President Secretariat and prior to the using of President Secretariat, this building was being used as Parliament of Bangladesh till February 1982 when it moved to the Jatiya Sangsad Bhaban.

The Office is located with a complex with a tree lined park and across from Tejgaon Airport.

Services and activities
Prime Minister's Office (PMO) is a division and equivalent to the ministry. Allocation of Business Among the different ministries and divisions has allocated some responsibilities. It provides:
 Secretarial assistance to the Prime Minister.
 Assistance to the Prime Minister in the discharge of his/her responsibilities as and when necessary.
 Assistance to the Prime Minister in the discharge of his/her Parliamentary responsibilities.
 Matters relating to Politics.
 Administration including financial matters of PMO.
 National Security Intelligence (NSI).
 Coordination of all Intelligence Agencies.
 NGO Affairs.
 Matters Relating to Board of Investment (BOI).
 Bangladesh Export Processing Zone Authority.
 Administration and supervision of subordinate offices and organizations under this office.
 Prime Minister's Security including Special Security Force.
 Administration of Prime Minister's Discretionary Fund.
 Messages and Addresses of the Prime Minister.
 Reception of Foreign Heads of Government and dignitaries.
 Arrangement of Protocol and Ceremonials.
 Tours of the Prime Minister inside country (Foreign tours to be organized by the Ministry of Foreign Affairs).
 Liaison with International Agencies and matters relating to treaties and agreements with other countries and world bodies relating to subjects assigned to this office.
 All laws on subjects assigned to this office.
 Inquiries and statistics on any of the subjects assigned to this office.
 Fees in respect of any of the subjects assigned to this office except fees taken in courts.
 Such other functions as may be assigned to this office from time to time.

Organization

Office Under PMO
 Cabinet Division
 Armed Forces Division
 National Economic Council
 Bangladesh Economic Zones Authority (BEZA)
 Bangladesh Export Processing Zone Authority (BEPZA)
 Bangladesh Investment Development Authority
 Public-Private Partnership Authority (PPPA)
 Governance Innovation Unit (GIU)
 National Security Intelligence (NSI)
 NGO Affairs Bureau
 Special Security Force
 Sub-regional Co-operation Cell (SRCC)
 Private Export Processing Zone (PEPZ)

Project Under PMO
 Project (Human Resource Development)
 Access to Information (A2I) Programme (ICT Services)
 Development Assistance for Special Area (except CHT)

See also
 Cabinet of Bangladesh
 Bangabhaban, principal office and residence of the president of Bangladesh.

References

Prime Ministers of Bangladesh